Anke Kracke (born Anke Wagner, 8 September 1983 in Mainz) is a German experimental physicist affiliated with the Max Planck Institute for Nuclear Physics, Heidelberg (MPIK).

Kracke studied physics at the Johannes Gutenberg University of Mainz. In 2007, she began doctoral work with Klaus Blaum at MPIK. She defended her thesis, The g-factor of the valence electron bound in lithiumlike silicon 28Si11+: The most stringent test of relativistic many-electron calculations in a magnetic field, in 2013. She subsequently worked as a post-doctoral researcher at Florida State University with Edmund G. Myers.

In 2012, she won the Helmholtz Prize for precision measurements together with her doctoral supervisor Klaus Blaum and Sven Sturm.

References 

1983 births
Living people
21st-century German physicists
21st-century German  women scientists
German women physicists